Tyler Brown (born 9 December 1999) is a professional Australian rules footballer who plays for the Adelaide Football Club in the Australian Football League (AFL). Son of 1994–1998 former Collingwood captain, Gavin Brown, he played for the Eastern Ranges in the TAC Cup before he was drafted to Collingwood in 2017 under the father–son rule.

State football
Brown played junior football with Templestowe in the Yarra Junior Football League, together with his brother Callum. He also starred for his private school, Marcellin College, in football and in 2016 joined Eastern Ranges in the TAC Cup. In July 2017, Brown had a breakout game against Bendigo Pioneers leading to talent manager Len Villani saying he has the "Brown brain". Later, after averaging 15 disposals over 4 games, he was invited to the AFL Draft Combine at Etihad Stadium.

After being drafted to Collingwood, Brown played 18 Victorian Football League (VFL) games, demonstrating versatility on the wing and in defence.

AFL career
Brown was drafted to Collingwood with the 50th pick of the 2017 AFL draft, which was Collingwood's third and final pick, under the father–son rule after Port Adelaide put in a bid for him. He has been compared to his father, Gavin Brown, with Eastern Ranges coach, Darren Bewick saying "he's a shy boy, very introverted in the way he goes about his business, but like his old man, he has a lot of ability." Brown got his first taste of senior football when he played in a pre-season match against Fremantle in the 2019 JLT Community Series. Despite not playing a senior game in his first two years at the club, he showed enough in the reserves to earn a contract extension until the end of 2020. In 2019, he was also often named as an emergency for the senior squad. He made his AFL debut in Collingwood's victory over Western Bulldogs in the opening round of the 2020 season at Marvel Stadium. Due to the COVID-19 pandemic, his debut was without a crowd.

After a 2022 AFL season in which both Brown and his brother Callum failed to establish themselves in new coach Craig McRae's best 22, both Brown brothers were delisted at the conclusion of that season.

Personal life
Brown is the son of former Collingwood captain, Gavin Brown, and brother of Callum Brown. His sister, Tarni Brown, was selected for the 2020 AFL Women's (AFLW) academy and was drafted by Collingwood in the 2020 AFL Women's draft under the father-daughter rule.

Statistics
Statistics are correct to the end of the 2022 season

|-
| scope="row" text-align:center | 2018
| 
| 34 || 0 || — || — || — || — || — || — || — || — || — || — || — || — || — || —
|- 
| scope="row" text-align:center | 2019
| 
| 34 || 0 || — || — || — || — || — || — || — || — || — || — || — || — || — || —
|-
| scope="row" text-align:center | 2020
| 
| 6 || 9 || 2 || 0 || 45 || 61 || 106 || 14 || 13 || 0.2 || 0.0 || 5.0 || 6.8 || 11.8 || 1.6 || 1.4
|- 
| scope="row" text-align:center | 2021
| 
| 6 || 7 || 0 || 0 || 35 || 60 || 95 || 14 || 11 || 0.0 || 0.0 || 5.0 || 8.6 || 13.6 || 2.0 || 1.6
|- 
| scope="row" text-align:center | 2022
| 
| 6 || 11 || 2 || 0 || 28 || 43 || 71 || 7 || 34 || 0.2 || 0.0 || 2.5 || 3.9 || 6.5 || 0.6 || 3.1
|- style="background:#eaeaea; font-weight:bold; width:2em"
| scope="row" text-align:center class="sortbottom" colspan=3 | Career
| 27
| 4
| 0
| 108
| 164
| 272
| 35
| 58
| 0.1
| 0.0
| 4.0
| 6.1
| 10.1
| 1.3
| 2.1
|}

Notes

References

External links

1999 births
Living people
Collingwood Football Club players
Eastern Ranges players
Australian rules footballers from Victoria (Australia)
People educated at Marcellin College, Bulleen